Yukon High School is a secondary school located within Canadian County in Yukon, Oklahoma. Famous alumni include country singer Garth Brooks.

Clubs and organizations
Yukon has won state titles in softball (1986, 1991, 1997, 2000, 2010); boys basketball (1974, 1979); baseball (1982, 1996, 1997); boys bowling (2012, 2014); cheerleading (2002); and pom (2004, 2012, 2014, 2018, 2019, 2020).

References

Public high schools in Oklahoma
Schools in Canadian County, Oklahoma